Varshets (variously transliterated) is a spa town in Montana Province, northwestern Bulgaria. It is the administrative centre of the homonymous Varshets Municipality. As of December 2019, its population is 5,444. It is one of the oldest resorts in northern Bulgaria, and is known for its mineral springs, mild mountain climate, and natural environment. The town's tourist infrastructure includes two spa centres, a polyclinic, several rest houses, hotels and also many private lodgings. Varshets has an art gallery, a municipal museum and an Eastern Orthodox church dedicated to Saint George.

A 2nd century BC bronze sculpture of a Thracian boy found in the vicinity of the town is today a symbol of Varshets. The modern town is linked to Medeca, a Roman and Byzantine site first mentioned in the 6th century AD. Varshets' existence was also evidenced in 16th century documents. The first state baths in Varshets were built in 1910 and were run by Damyan Ivanov, a balneologist who specialized in Austria-Hungary. The New Baths were built in 1930, and the Sun Garden was arranged in 1934. In 1950, Varshets was proclaimed a national resort.

Places named after Varshets

Varshets Saddle on Smith Island, South Shetland Islands is named after Varshets.

"Varshets" is also the name of the paleontological locality of Middle Villafranchian (Late Pliocene) fauna and flora near the village of Dolno Ozirovo close to the town of Varshets.

Notable people
 Lachezar Stanchev, a poet born in Villa Nezabravka.

References

External links

 Varshets.info – news information site of Varshets
 Varshets.com – Varshets business site (in Bulgarian only)
 Tourism in Varshets (archived)

Towns in Bulgaria
Populated places in Montana Province
Spa towns in Bulgaria